State Route 123 (SR 123) is a  state highway that serves Geneva, Houston, and Dale counties as a connection between Hartford, Ozark, and Ariton. SR 123 intersects SR 167 and Geneva County Route 61 (CR 61) at its southern terminus, south of Hartford and US 231 at its northern terminus, west of Ariton.

Route description

SR 123 begins at an intersection with SR 167 just south of Hartford. The roadway continues as Geneva CR 61. From this point, the highway travels in a northerly direction where it intersects SR 52 in the central business district of Hartford. From Hartford, SR 123 travels in a northeasterly direction before turning to the north upon entering Houston County and intersecting SR 103. The highway continues through its intersection with US 84 (internally designated as SR 12) and continues in its northerly course into Dale County after crossing the Little Choctawhatchee River. SR 123 continues along its northerly course in Dale County where it intersects SR 134 and travels concurrent with it for approximately  through the town of Newton. From the end of this concurrency through Ozark, SR 123 continues generally in this northern course in passing both Fort Rucker and Blackwell Field. Upon leaving Ozark, the highway continues in a northwesterly course en route to Ariton where it then turns in a westerly direction where it meets its northern terminus with US 231.

Major intersections

See also

References

123
Transportation in Geneva County, Alabama
Transportation in Houston County, Alabama
Transportation in Dale County, Alabama